Tajlu Khanum or Tajli Begum, also known by her title of Shah-Begi Khanum, was a Turkoman princess from the Mawsillu tribe and principal consort of Ismail I.

Family 
While Italian writer Angiolello and Iranian historian Manuchihr Parsaʹdust agree that she was a granddaughter of the Aq Qoyunlu ruler Yaqub (r. 1478–1490) via a daughter, John Woods proposed her paternal lineage as Mihmad Beg being her father and Amir Hamza being her grandfather. Jean Aubin on the other hand, proposed Bakr Beg Mawsillu as her maternal grandfather. She also had a sister named Beksi Khanum.

Marriage 
According to Angiolello and Ramusio, the Safavid shah Ismail I (r. 1501–1524) married Tajlu Khanum after defeating the Aq Qoyunlu ruler Murad ibn Ya'qub in 1503, but according to the Safavid-period historians such as Budaq Monshi Qazvini, she was the wife of the Afrasiyabid ruler Kiya Husayn II, who had during the dissolution of the Aq Qoyunlu confederation expanded his rule from western Mazandaran into parts of Persian Iraq. Ismail I invaded the latters territories and put an end to his rule in 1504, where he afterwards took Tajlu Khanum into his harem. She thereafter become Ismail's most beloved wife, and bore him two sons Tahmasp Mirza and Bahram Mirza Safavi and two daughters Parikhan Khanum and Mahinbanu Khanum.

Life in Safavid court 
Her supposed capture at Battle of Chaldiran was a major source of controversy among historians of Iran and Ottoman Empire. While Ottoman sources wrote that she was captured during battle and even conversed with Selim I, according to Safavid sources she was lost but found by Mirza Shah Hossein, who because of this rose to the rank of wakil in Safavid court. According to Roger Savory, it was Behruza Khanum, another wife of Ismail I who was captured and apparently later remarried.

Tajlu financed shrine of Fatima al-Masuma in Qom in 1519, supported Tahmasp Mirza's elevation to throne in 1524. But was banished to Shiraz in 1540 because of treason by his son. She later died and buried in Bibi Dokhtaran mausoleum.

References

Sources 
 
 
 

Safavid queens consort
16th-century Iranian women
17th-century Iranian women
Iranian Turkmen people
1488 births
1540 deaths
16th-century people of Safavid Iran
Mawsillu